NGC 6087 (also known as Caldwell 89 or the S Normae Cluster) is an open cluster of 40 or more stars centered on the Cepheid variable S Normae in the constellation Norma.  At a distance of about 3500 ly and covering a field of almost one quarter of a degree, the stars range from seventh- to eleventh-magnitude, the brightest being 6.5 magnitude S Normae.  The aggregate visual magnitude of the cluster is about 5.4.

Spectral analysis of the radial motion of the stars confirm that S Normae is a member of the cluster, and the period/luminosity relationship of Cepheid variables allows the distance to be determined with confidence.

References

External links
 

Open clusters
Norma (constellation)
6087
089b